The Children of the Wind is a novel by Geraldine Harris published in 1982.

Plot summary
The Children of the Wind is a novel in which there is a quest for seven keys of seven sorcerers.

Reception
Dave Langford reviewed The Children of the Wind for White Dwarf #58, and stated that "Harris is reasonably – though not wildly – inventive, and puts real effort into making her characters humanly flawed and changeable."

Reviews
Review by Roger C. Schlobin (1983) in Fantasy Newsletter, #62 September 1983
Review by Baird Searles (1983) in Isaac Asimov's Science Fiction Magazine, November 1983

References

1982 novels